The Frank E. Schoonover Studios in Wilmington, Delaware comprise a historic building that was used by the students of illustrator Howard Pyle, including the original tenants  Frank Schoonover, N.C. Wyeth, Harvey Dunn, and Clifford Ashley. Philanthropist and art collector Samuel Bancroft paid for the building which was designed by the prominent local architect Capt. E.L. Rice, Jr. and built in 1905 in a simplified Queen Anne or Shavian Manorial style. It was added to the National Register of Historic Places in 1979.

Schoonover remained in his studio, Number 1, until the end of his career, but the other original tenants moved out within ten years.  Other artists moved in but Schoonover eventually became the sole owner of the property. After his death in 1972, a group of artists restored the building.

In 2006 the Delaware History Museum held a special exhibition about the Studios.

See also
Delaware Art Museum
Howard Pyle Studios

References

External links
Schoonover Studios

Buildings and structures on the National Register of Historic Places in Delaware
Queen Anne architecture in Delaware
Industrial buildings completed in 1905
Buildings and structures in New Castle County, Delaware
National Register of Historic Places in Wilmington, Delaware
1905 establishments in Delaware